An embedded flashing-light system or an in-pavement flashing-light system is a type of device that is used at existing or new pedestrian crosswalks to warn drivers of oncoming pedestrian traffic. The device usually consists of LED lights that are embedded into the roadway alongside the crosswalk and are oriented to face oncoming traffic. When a pedestrian approaches the crosswalk, the system is activated and the LED lights begin to flash simultaneously. These lights are programmed to flash for a period of time that is sufficient for an average pedestrian to cross.

History
The concept for an embedded pavement flashing light system was conceived by pilot Michael Harrison in Santa Rosa, California, in 1992 after a friend was involved in a pedestrian accident. He based it on his experience with airport runway lights embedded in the pavement, Mr. Harrison went on to found Lightguard Systems.

Types
There are two different types of embedded pavement flashing light systems, passive and active. These types differ in how the system is activated.

With a passive system, the pedestrian activates the device merely by walking up to the crosswalk. This is accomplished by using one of several motion detection devices. These include microwave, motion sensors, video detection, pressure plates, or a light trip beam. With an active system, the device is usually activated by a button that a pedestrian pushes to cross. These active systems are generally similar to lighted pedestrian signs at traffic intersections. Because many pedestrians may not realize that they need to press a button to activate the system, it is generally recommended to install a passive system.

Effectiveness
Compared with other types of warning devices, the effectiveness of the embedded pavement flashing light system seems to be high. When approaching a crosswalk with an embedded pavement flashing light system, drivers are more apt to slow down and yield to pedestrians than when drivers approach a crosswalk with another type of lighted warning device. Also, compared to a crosswalk with no warning device, drivers are more likely to slow down and yield to pedestrians when the embedded pavement flashing light system is in place.

References

External links
www.lightguardsystems.com, Smart Crosswalk(tm) In-Roadway Warning Lights (aka. Lighted Crosswalks)
www.LaneLight.com, Flashing Crosswalk Warning Systems
www.livablestreets.com  (this link returns a Server Not Found error)
Investigating Improvements to Pedestrian Crossings FHWA.dot.gov

Pedestrian crossings
Road safety
Road traffic management